The Toto Japan Classic is an annual women's professional golf tournament in Japan, jointly sanctioned by the two richest women's professional tours: the U.S.-based LPGA Tour and the LPGA of Japan Tour. It was an unofficial money event on the LPGA Tour from 1973 to 1975. It has taken place every year since 1973 at various locations, and is typically held in early November. From  2006 through 2015, the event has been played at Kintetsu Kashikojima Country Club in Shima, Mie. In 2016 and 2017, the events have been held at Minori Course of Taiheiyo Club in Omitama, Ibaraki, then changed back to the North Course of Seta Golf Course in Ōtsu, Shiga prefecture for 2018 events.

The tournament has had various names and sponsors throughout its history. Its current title sponsor is Toto Ltd. a Japanese bathroom products supplier.

Annika Sörenstam won the tournament five consecutive times from 2001 to 2005.

In 2007, Momoko Ueda of Japan scored a final round double eagle to win by two strokes over runners-up Maria Hjorth and Reilley Rankin.

Tournament names
1973–1974: LPGA Japan Classic
1975: Japan Classic
1976: LPGA/Japan Mizuno Classic
1977–1979: Mizuno Japan Classic
1980–1992: Mazda Japan Classic
1993–1997: Toray Japan Queens Cup
1998: Japan Classic
1999–2014: Mizuno Classic
2015–present: Toto Japan Classic

Winners

PO Won sudden-death playoff
1 The 1990 tournament was shortened to 36 holes due to rain. 
2 The 2020 tournament was not sanctioned by the LPGA. 
3 The 2021 tournament was not sanctioned by the LPGA.

References

External links
 
Coverage on LPGA's official site
Coverage on JLPGA's official site 

LPGA Tour events
LPGA of Japan Tour events
Golf tournaments in Japan
Sport in Mie Prefecture
Recurring sporting events established in 1973
1973 establishments in Japan
Mainichi Broadcasting System
Toray Industries